Krunoslav "Kruno" Jurčić (born 26 November 1969) is a Croatian professional football manager and former player.

Playing career

Club
Jurčić started his professional career at Dinamo Zagreb in 1988, before moving to Inker Zaprešić in 1991 and Istra in 1993. He joined Belgian side Beveren in 1995, but returned to Dinamo Zagreb after one season following Beveren's relegation from the top flight. He subsequently spent three seasons with Dinamo Zagreb, also playing for them in the group stage of the UEFA Champions League in 1998. He then went on to spend three seasons in Italy with Torino and Sampdoria, before returning to Croatia by signing with Slaven Belupo in 2002. He finished his career with Slaven in 2004.

International
Jurčić made his debut for Croatia in a June 1997 Kirin Cup match against hosts Japan, coming on as a 59th-minute substitute for Nenad Pralija, and earned a total of 21 caps, scoring no goals. He played three full matches at the 1998 FIFA World Cup finals, where Croatia finished in third place. His final international was a September 2000 World Cup qualification match away against Belgium.

Managerial career
Jurčić started his managerial career at Croatian First League side Pula. In his first season as head coach, Pula finished the 2005–06 season in sixth place, which was the highest ever top division placement for the club. In 2007, he was offered the head coaching position at Slaven Belupo. They finished the season in second place (best ever league position in club history) and qualified for the 2008–09 UEFA Cup. He left the club in 2008 and went on to join the reigning Croatian champions and his former club, Dinamo Zagreb, on 5 March 2009. With Dinamo he won his first managerial titles  by winning the 2008–09 and 2009–10 Prva HNL and Croatian Cup in 2009. On 19 May 2010 Krunoslav Jurčić resigned as the coach of Dinamo Zagreb.

He returned to Dinamo after Vahid Halilhodžić resigned in 2011 and remained manager until December of the same year, when he was fired after Zagreb's final group game of the UEFA Champions League against Lyon, having failed to pick up any points.

After appearing as a football pundit in various sports papers and during football matches broadcasting, Jurčić was included in Igor Štimac's staff that took charge of Croatia national football team after Euro 2012. In late November 2012 Jurčić once again returned to Dinamo Zagreb, replacing sacked Ante Čačić.

On 22 August 2013, Jurčić was sacked after Dinamo Zagreb lost 2–0 at home to Austria Wien in the Europa League play-off round.

On 29 February 2016, he was sacked from Maribor after a 1–0 home defeat against Celje.

Jurčić was appointed manager of Turkish club Adanaspor on 28 August 2016 on a two-year contract.

In November 2017, Jurčić signed a contract with the Saudi Arabian Football Federation to become the new head of youth player development.

In 2018, he signed with Saudi Arabian side Al-Nassr.

On 28 May 2018, he was named the head coach of Baniyas Club.

In October 2019, Jurčić moved back to the UAE where he was appointed as the head coach of Al Nasr. In February 2021, Jurčić left Al Nasr despite winning the UAE League Cup, due to mediocre results in the league.

Managerial statistics

Honours

Player
Inter Zaprešić
 Croatian Cup: 1992
Dinamo Zagreb
 Croatian champions: 1996–97, 1997–98, 1998–99, 1999–2000
 Croatian Cup: 1997, 1998

Manager
Dinamo Zagreb
 Croatian champions: 2008–09, 2009–10, 2012–13
 Croatian Cup: 2009
 Croatian Supercup: 2013
Al Nasr
 Emirati League Cup: 2019–20

Orders
 Order of Danica Hrvatska with face of Franjo Bučar – 1995
 Order of the Croatian Trefoil – 1998

References

External links

1969 births
Living people
People from Ljubuški
Croats of Bosnia and Herzegovina
Association football midfielders
Yugoslav footballers
Croatian footballers
Croatia international footballers
1998 FIFA World Cup players
GNK Dinamo Zagreb players
NK Inter Zaprešić players
NK Istra players
K.S.K. Beveren players
Torino F.C. players
U.C. Sampdoria players
NK Slaven Belupo players
Croatian Football League players
Belgian Pro League players
Serie A players
Serie B players
Croatian expatriate footballers
Expatriate footballers in Belgium
Croatian expatriate sportspeople in Belgium
Expatriate footballers in Italy
Croatian expatriate sportspeople in Italy
Croatian football managers
NK Istra 1961 managers
NK Slaven Belupo managers
GNK Dinamo Zagreb managers
NK Lokomotiva Zagreb managers
NK Maribor managers
Adanaspor managers
Saudi Arabia national football team managers
Al Nassr FC managers
Baniyas SC managers
Al-Nasr SC (Dubai) managers
Croatian Football League managers
Saudi Professional League managers
UAE Pro League managers
Croatian expatriate football managers
Expatriate football managers in Slovenia
Croatian expatriate sportspeople in Slovenia
Expatriate football managers in Turkey
Croatian expatriate sportspeople in Turkey
Expatriate football managers in Saudi Arabia
Croatian expatriate sportspeople in Saudi Arabia
Expatriate football managers in the United Arab Emirates
Croatian expatriate sportspeople in the United Arab Emirates